Pyrausta chrysopygalis is a moth in the family Crambidae. It was described by Staudinger in 1900. The type locality is in Altai Republic, Russia.

References

Moths described in 1900
chrysopygalis
Moths of Asia